The Devil's Trap is a 1962 Czechoslovak historical film directed by František Vláčil. It was inspired by Alfréd Technik's novel Mlýn na ponorné řece. It is considered the first part of a loose trilogy of historical films by Vláčil, the others being Marketa Lazarová
and The Valley of the Bees.

The film's main theme is the conflict between religion and science. Religion is represented by a fanatical Jesuit priest, while science is represented by an old miller and his son. Vláčil wanted the film to depict the 17th century as authentically as possible.

Plot
The film is set in the early 17th century. The Regent of Valeč dislikes Spálený, the local miller, whom local people greatly respect. Spálený knows the local lands well, but his family is suspected of witchcraft due to an incident that occurred generations before. When Swedish soldiers arrive and plunder the land, they also burn the mill, but Spálený and his family miraculously survive. Probus, a fanatical priest, is invited to investigate Spálený. Probus unsuccessfully tries to turn the local people against Spálený. Probus and the Regent then attempt to capture Spálený, but he disappears into a cave complex under the mill. Probus and the Regent try to find him, but they cause a landslide. Only Spálený's son Jan and his girlfriend Martina survive.

Cast 
Vítězslav Vejražka as Spálený
Miroslav Macháček as Probus
Vít Olmer as Jan
Čestmír Řanda as a Regent
Karla Chadimová as Martina
Vlastimil Hašek as Gamekeeper Filip

Reception

Accolades

References

External links
 

1960s adventure drama films
1960s historical adventure films
1962 films
Films directed by František Vláčil
Czech adventure drama films
Czech historical adventure films
1960s Czech-language films
Czechoslovak drama films
1962 drama films
Witch hunting in fiction